The History and Culture of the Indian People is a series of eleven volumes on the history of India, from prehistoric times to the establishment of the modern state in 1947. Historian Ramesh Chandra Majumdar was the general editor of the series, as well as a major contributor. The entire work took 26 years to complete. The set was published in India by the Bharatiya Vidya Bhavan, Mumbai.

Overview
The first volume (1951) is about the Vedic period. It has 27 chapters by 11 contributors. Three chapters and part of a fourth were written by R. C. Majumdar. Other contributors to the first volume are V. M. Apte, A. D. Pusalker and B. K. Gosh. The volume discusses the archaeology, geology, flora, fauna and other aspects of this period and includes a chapter on the palaeolithic, neolithic and copper ages  by H. D. Sankalia. This volume was first published by George Allen & Unwin Ltd in London though it was prepared under the auspices of Bharatiya Itihasa Samiti, a part of Bharatiya Vidya Bhavan. Its subsequent editions and other volumes were published in India by Bharatiya Vidya Bhavan.

The sixth volume (1960) is on the sultanate period of medieval India. This volume consists of 19 chapters by 19 contributors. Six chapters and parts of four other chapters were written by R. C. Majumdar. Other significant contributors to this volume are S. Roy, A. K. Majumdar, P. M. Joshi, N. Venkataramanya, S. K. Chatterjee and S. K. Saraswati.

The seventh volume (1974) is on the Mughal era. This volume has 24 chapters by 28 contributors. Only parts of two chapters were written by R. C. Majumdar. The most significant contributors to this volume are J. N. Chaudhuri, G. S. Sardesai, A. L. Srivastava, Abdur Rashid and S. Roy.

Reception

Upon the appearance of the first volume in the series, in a review in the Isis journal M.F. Ashley Montagu described it as:

Marxist historian D. N. Jha however describes the first three volumes as:

Historian John Keay describes the work as:

See also
 The New Cambridge History of India

References

External links
 Volume 1: The Vedic Age [Prehistory to 600 B.C.]
 Volume 2: The Age of Imperial Unity [600 B.C. to 320 A.D.]
 Volume 3: The Classical Age [320-750 A.D.]
 Volume 4: The Age of Imperial Kanauj [750-1000 A.D.]
 Volume 5: The Struggle for Empire [1000-1300 A.D.]
 Volume 6: The Delhi Sultanate [1300-1526]
 Volume 7: The Mughul Empire [1526-1707]
 Volume 8: The Maratha Supremacy [1707-1818]
 Volume 9: British Paramountcy and Indian Renaissance, Part 1 [1818-1905]
 Volume 10: British Paramountcy and Indian Renaissance, Part 2 [1818-1905]
 Volume 11: Struggle for Freedom [1905-1947]

History books about India
1951 non-fiction books
Bharatiya Vidya Bhavan